{{DISPLAYTITLE:C11H14O4}}
The molecular formula C11H14O4 (molar mass: 210.22 g/mol, exact mass: 210.0892 u) may refer to:

 Dimethyl carbate
 Sinapyl alcohol

Molecular formulas